Oh Se-young is a South Korean actress. She is known for her roles in dramas such as Thirty-Nine, Alice, The Beauty Inside  and VIP. She also appeared in movies such as The Nightmare, Hundred Years Later, There's No One, Diary and The Day I Died: Unclosed Case.

Filmography

Television series

Web series

Film

Theatre

References

External links 
 

1996 births
Living people
21st-century South Korean actresses
South Korean television actresses
South Korean film actresses